John Wildsmith (born 1 July 1939) is an Australian former cricketer. He played ten first-class cricket matches for Victoria between 1959 and 1963.

See also
 List of Victoria first-class cricketers

References

External links
 

1939 births
Living people
Australian cricketers
Victoria cricketers
Cricketers from Melbourne